The 2003 Three Days of De Panne was the 27th edition of the Three Days of De Panne cycle race and was held on 1 April to 3 April 2003. The race started in Middelkerke and finished in De Panne. The race was won by Raivis Belohvoščiks.

General classification

References

Three Days of Bruges–De Panne
2003 in Belgian sport